The album consists of two works composed by Steve Reich, Double Sextet and 2×5. Double Sextet, which won the 2009 Pulitzer Prize for Music, is written for two identical sextets of flute, clarinet, vibraphone, piano, violin and cello. It has been recently quoted as being "among the finest pieces of our time" by The Philadelphia Inquirer. The piece lasts roughly 22 minutes.

2×5 is for two identical quintets consisting of two electric guitars, bass guitar, piano and drum set. It is described as a "rock and roll piece", lasting around 20 minutes.

Tracks
Double Sextet
Fast
Slow
Fast

2×5
Fast
Slow
Fast

References

Compositions by Steve Reich